Luciano Conati (17 March 1950 – 6 February 2016) was an Italian professional racing cyclist. He rode in the 1976 Tour de France.

References

External links
 

1950 births
2016 deaths
Cyclists from the Province of Verona
Italian male cyclists